The Night Is Young is a 1935 American romantic musical film starring Ramon Novarro and Evelyn Laye.  The film is based on a story written by Vicki Baum and directed by Dudley Murphy.

Plot
When ballerina Fanni learns that the Vienese archduke, Paul Gustave, is expected to be in the audience of her next performance, she immediately makes plans to court the wealthy bachelor and spurn Willy Fitch, her sweetheart. Though Fanni assures her friend and fellow dancer Lisl Gluck that her pursuit of the archduke will be done strictly in the name of "patriotism," Lisl advises her to stick with Willy, a carriage driver. As planned, the handsome Paul spies the lovely ballerinas on stage, but instead of choosing Fanni, he becomes interested in Lisl. Paul, who is expected to marry Countess Rafay, is informed that for state reasons the marriage cannot take place for another six months. Seizing this opportunity, Paul decides to keep young Lisl as his secret lover during that time. Lisl, who is engaged to Toni, a failing ballet producer, is invited to attend a dinner at Paul's villa by his valet, Szereny, and though she rejects the offer, the valet tells her that she must accept the invitation. Fanny, upon learning that the archduke has passed her over in favor of her friend, tells Willy that she is now available for marriage. Willy, however, shows little enthusiasm for marriage, and sings a song in which he praises the virtues of his horse "Mitzi" instead of those of his wife-to-be.

When Lisl arrives at the archduke's palace, she is subjected to a rigorous physical inspection by Szereny to ensure that she meets Paul's requirements, an examination that she finds offensive and degrading. When she finally meets Paul, he is less than amorous and immediately tells her that his relationship with her will have nothing to do with love, and that she will be expected to live in special quarters in the house and not disturb him. Paul is surprised, however, to learn that Lisl is not interested in making love to him either. Later, when Paul spends an evening out with the Countess Rafay, the lonely Lisl invites Toni and Willy to visit her. Upon his return, the ill-tempered archduke prepares to admonish her for conducting such merriment in his home but softens when he hears her sing. A romance between Paul and Lisl soon blooms when the two are stranded on a carnival Ferris wheel and are forced to spend the night together. The next day, the lovers are visited by the jealous Toni, who accuses Lisl of walking out on their planned marriage. However, Toni immediately permits Lisl to resume her romance with Paul when he learns that the archduke intends to finance his ballet. Though Paul is willing to sacrifice his title in order to get out of his arranged marriage to Countess Rafay and marry Lisl, the emperor insists that the arranged marriage take place. When Paul informs Lisl that he must leave her, Szereny consoles the devastated Lisl, and following a tearful farewell dinner, Paul asks Lisl to kiss him and then turn around and never look back.

Cast
 Ramon Novarro as Archduke Paul 'Gustl' Gustave
 Evelyn Laye as Elizabeth Katherine Anne 'Lisl' Gluck
 Charles Butterworth as Willy Fitch
 Una Merkel as Fanni Kerner
 Edward Everett Horton as Baron Szereny
 Donald Cook as Toni Berngruber
 Henry Stephenson as Emperor Franz Josef
 Rosalind Russell as Countess Zarika Rafay
 Herman Bing as Nepomuk
 Gustav von Seyffertitz as Ambassador (uncredited)

Reception
Andre Sennwald in The New York Times wrote, "According to the current standards of costumed musical romances, "The Night Is Young" is invincibly correct".

References

External links
 
 
 
 

1935 films
1935 musical comedy films
1935 romantic comedy films
American musical comedy films
American romantic comedy films
American romantic musical films
American black-and-white films
Films directed by Dudley Murphy
Films set in Austria
Films set in Vienna
Films set in the 1900s
Metro-Goldwyn-Mayer films
Films produced by Harry Rapf
Films with screenplays by Franz Schulz
1930s romantic musical films
Films with screenplays by Edgar Allan Woolf
1930s English-language films
1930s American films